Hibbertia propinqua is a species of flowering plant in the family Dilleniaceae and is endemic to a restricted area in the west of Western Australia. It is an erect to spreading shrub with linear to narrow oblong leaves and yellow flowers arranged amongst clusters of leaves, the flowers with eight to ten stamens all on one side of the two carpels.

Description
There are eight to ten stamens all on one side of the two carpels, each carpel with two ovules. Flowering has been recorded from August to September.

Taxonomy
Hibbertia propinqua was first formally described in 2009 by Kevin Thiele in the journal Nuytsia from specimens collected near Warradarge by Michael Clyde Hislop in 2002. The specific epithet (propinqua) means "near" or "neighbouring", referring to the similarity of this species to H. fasciculiflora.

Distribution and habitat
This species grows in woodland and kwongan between Eneabba and the Coomallo Nature Reserve in the Geraldton Sandplains biogeographic region in the west of Western Australia.

Conservation status
Hibbertia propinqua is classified as "Priority Four" by the Government of Western Australia Department of Biodiversity, Conservation and Attractions, meaning that is rare or near threatened.

See also
List of Hibbertia species

References

propinqua
Flora of Western Australia
Plants described in 2015
Taxa named by Kevin Thiele